The San Vicente Stakes is an American thoroughbred horse race run annually at Santa Anita Park. A Grade II event, the race is open to three-year-old horses willing to race seven furlongs on the dirt and currently carries a purse of $200,000.

History
Inaugurated in 1935 as the San Vicente Handicap, it was open to older horses until 1937. The race was run as a handicap event from 1935 until 1941, 1945 through 1948, 1956 through 1958, and 1960 through 1965. There was no race held from 1942 until 1944, 1949 until 1951, and again in 1970.

In 1952 and 1953 the race was restricted to colts and geldings.

Since inception, it has been run at various distances:
 6 furlongs : 1935–1936, 1952–54
 7 furlongs : 1937–1939, 1949–1951, 1955 to present
 1 mile : 1940–46
  miles : 1947–1948

Louis B. Mayer's U.S. Racing Hall of Fame filly, Busher, won this race against males in 1945.  The filly, Hubble Bubble, won in 1947.  In 2009 Evita Argentina became the third filly to win this race in 68 runnings.

The race was once frequently used as an early prep for the Kentucky Derby for horses such as Swaps. Silver Charm, who won the San Vicente in 1997, went on to win that year's Derby and Preakness Stakes. However, because of its sprint distance, it is not part of the official Road to the Kentucky Derby and is now rarely used by Derby hopefuls. An exception was in 2016, when both Nyquist (the eventual Derby winner) and Exaggerator (the eventual Preakness winner) started their three-year-old campaigns in the race.

Records
Speed  record:
 1:20.01 – Georgie Boy (2008) (synthetic surface)
 1:20.71 – Nyquist (dirt)

Most wins by a jockey:
 8 – Bill Shoemaker (1955, 1956, 1964, 1965, 1966, 1967, 1976, 1980)

Most wins by a trainer:
 11- Bob Baffert (1997, 1999, 2003, 2005, 2006, 2011, 2012, 2013, 2015, 2020,2021)

Most wins by an owner:
 3 – Rex C. Ellsworth (1947, 1955, 1956)

Winners of the San Vicente Stakes

References

Horse races in California
Santa Anita Park
Flat horse races for three-year-olds
Triple Crown Prep Races
Graded stakes races in the United States
Grade 2 stakes races in the United States